Call to Arms is the only album by American heavy metal band C4, released in 2001. It features covers of songs by Batio's previous band's, Nitro and Holland. The album cover is based on a real-life incident of a church in Texas being demolished by a natural disaster, and depicts two small figures—of Jesus and one of his disciples—near the wreckage. The meaning is that "when everything else is gone, there is still faith".

Track listing

Personnel

Dan Lenegar – lead vocals, backing vocals
Michael Angelo – guitars, keyboards, production, engineering
Bill Kopecky – six-string bass
John Mrozek – drums, backing vocals

Chris Djuricic – mixing
Trevor Sadler – mastering
Chris Erbach – photography

References

2001 debut albums
M.A.C.E. Music albums